Dilston is a rural and residential locality in the local government area (LGA) of Launceston in Tasmania. The 2021 census recorded a population of 558 for the state suburb of Dilston.

History 
Dilston was gazetted as a locality in 1963.

Dilston Post Office opened in 1871 and closed in 1975.

Geography
The waters of the Tamar River form most of the western boundary.

Road infrastructure
The East Tamar Highway (A8) enters from the south and runs through to the north, where it exits. Route C742 (John Lees Drive) runs parallel to and west of the A8 for a considerable distance, being joined to it at intersections in the south and north of the locality. Route C739 (Windermere Road) starts at an intersection with C742 and runs west until it exits.

References

Suburbs of Launceston, Tasmania
Localities of City of Launceston
Towns in Tasmania